Zaleptus festivus is a species of harvestmen in the family Sclerosomatidae from Siam.

References

Harvestmen
Animals described in 1889